Dmytro Serhiyovych Lunin (born on 31 March 1980), is a Ukrainian businessman and statesman, who is currently the acting governor of Poltava Oblast since 24 December 2021.

He is a doctor of law.

Biography

Dmytro Lunin was born on 31 March 1980 in Kharkiv.

He graduated from Kharkiv school No. 119.

In 2001, he graduated from the National Technical University "Kharkiv Polytechnic Institute" (specialty "Economics and Entrepreneurship") and received a bachelor's degree.

In 2003, he graduated from the National Technical University "Kharkiv Polytechnic Institute" (specialty "Economic Cybernetics, engineer-manager").

From November 2003 to February 2005, he was the Head of the Sales Department, Troyanda-Kharkiv LLC, in Kharkiv.

From March 2005 to May 2009, he was the director of the Commercial Department of LLC TV "Khladoprom", Kharkiv.

From 2006 to 2013, he studied at The Open University, MBA.

From May 2009 to July 2015, he was the director of Hladik Trade LLC, Kharkov.

From August 2015 to March 2017, he was the director of the Commercial Department of Ice Retail LLC, in Zaporizhzhia.

From 2016 to 2017, he studied at the Kyiv-Mohyla Business School, studying finance and marketing.

Between March 2017 and November 2019, Lunin became an entrepreneur in Kharkiv.

From November 2018 to November 2019, he was a founder, and a commercial director of 4E Consulting LLC, in Kharkiv.

From December 2019 to 24 December 2021, Lunin was the First Deputy Chairman of the Poltava Regional State Administration, while residing in Poltava.

In 2021, he graduated from the Educational and Scientific Institute "Institute of Public Administration" KhNU named after V.N. Karazin, with a specialty of "Public administration".

On 24 December 2021, Lunin became the acting Governor of Poltava Oblast.

Family

Lunin's father, Serhiy, was part of the Department of Agriculture, and a Master of Public Administration. His mother, Larysa, is a honored teacher of Ukraine.

He raises two sons.

Sports

He is a candidate for Master of Sports in boxing, basketball, swimming. He was a winner of all-Ukrainian competitions.

References

1980 births
Living people
21st-century Ukrainian politicians
Governors of Poltava Oblast
Politicians from Kharkiv
Kharkiv Polytechnic Institute alumni